I Thought of Numbers is the debut extended play (EP) by Australian electronic music band Cut Copy, released on 10 September 2001 by Modular Recordings.

Track listing

Personnel
Credits adapted from the liner notes of I Thought of Numbers.

 Dan Whitford – production
 Robbie Chater – assistant engineering
 Bennett Foddy – assistant engineering
 Mike Marsh – mastering

References

2001 debut EPs
Cut Copy albums
Modular Recordings EPs